Jōō may refer to:
 Jyouou (TV series), a Japanese television drama
 Jōō (Kamakura period), a Japanese era name (1222–1224)
 Jōō (Edo period), a Japanese era name (1652–1655)
 Takeno Jōō (1502–1555), Japanese tea master
 Jōō (manga)

See also
 JOO (disambiguation)